A soakage, or soak, is a source of water in Australian deserts.

It is called thus because the water generally seeps into the sand, and is stored below, sometimes as part of an ephemeral river or creek.

Aboriginal water source
Soakages were traditionally important sources of water for Aboriginal Australians in the desert, being the most dependable source in times of drought in Australia.

Aboriginal peoples would scoop out the sand or mud using a coolamon or woomera, often to a depth of several metres, until clean water gathered in the base of the hole. Knowing the precise location of each soakage was extremely valuable knowledge. It is also sometimes called a native well.

Anthropologist Donald Thomson wrote:

Cleaning and maintaining the well
Wells were covered to keep them free from fouling by animals. This involved blocking the well with dead branches and uprooted trees. When the wells fell into disrepair, people would bail the well, using the coolamon to throw slush against the wall. This would set like a cement wash and help to hold loose sand, preventing it from falling into the water.

Wells could be up to fifteen feet deep, with small toe holds cut into the walls.

Recording well locations
Donald Thomson writes:

White explorers and the wells
In the nineteenth century, both Warburton and Carnegie recorded that they had run down Aboriginal residents with camels and captured and chained them to compel them to reveal their secret sources of water. This action left a lasting impression on Aboriginal residents of desert regions, who would have handed accounts of this down through successive generations.

In the 1930s, when H. H. Finlayson made his journeys through the desert by camel, he noted that a gelded male camel, after a hard three-and-a-half-day journey in intense heat without water, drank  by actual measure without stopping, and fifteen minutes later, another .

This sheds light on the resentment built up among the Aboriginal population against explorers for the exploitation and, by enlarging well entrances and digging out springs, the devastation of their precious water supplies to satisfy camel teams.

Don McLeod (Aboriginal rights activist, see Pilbara#20th century) also tells a story of clashes over soak water at the time of the gold rushes in Western Australia:

McLeod relates a story told to him by an old prospector by the name of Long, observing an Aboriginal man and woman:

See also
 Bindibu Expedition
 Canning Stock Route
 Claypan
 Groundwater
 Waterhole
 Soak dike

References

External links

 Us Mob - Finding water in the desert

Geography of Australia
History of Indigenous Australians
Australian Aboriginal bushcraft
Australian English
Water
Hydrology
Aquifers
Water wells
Exploration of Western Australia
Agriculture in Australia
Water supply and sanitation in Australia